Public Toilet is a 2002 movie by Hong Kong director Fruit Chan, his first in digital format.

Plot 
The story revolves around a Beijing man, "Dong-dong", who was born in a public toilet.  To look for his past, he searches lavatories around the world.

Cast
 Tsuyoshi Abe – Dong Dong
 Ma Zhe – Tony
 Pietero Diletti – Stone
 Jang Hyuk – Kim
 Jo In-sung – Cho
 Kim Yang-hie – Ocean Girl
 Jo Kuk – Jo
 Sam Lee – Sam
 Oh Se-jeong

Production 
Chan was inspired by the terrible quality of public toilets in mainland China while filming Durian Durian (2000), which served as the concept for Public Toilet.

Chan shot digital video for the film at the request of the investor, Digital Nega.

References

External links
 
 Public Toilet at Hong Kong Cinemagic

Hong Kong drama films
South Korean drama films
2002 films
Films directed by Fruit Chan
2000s Hong Kong films
2000s South Korean films